The Mountain is a 1956 adventure drama film starring Spencer Tracy and Robert Wagner. The supporting cast included Claire Trevor, Richard Arlen, William Demarest, and Anna Kashfi. It is based on La neige en deuil, a 1952 French novel by Henri Troyat which was inspired by the crash of Air India Flight 245 in 1950.

Plot
When a passenger plane crashes near the top of Mont Blanc in the French Alps, greedy Christopher Teller (Wagner) decides to go and rob the dead. However, he has no hope of getting to the crash site without the help of his older brother Zachary (Tracy), a highly skilled mountain climber. Zachary wants to leave the dead in peace, but Chris hounds him until he finally gives in.

When they reach the downed plane, they find one badly injured survivor, an Indian woman (Kashfi). Chris wants to leave her there to die, but Zachary insists on bringing her down the mountain.

On the descent, Chris, ignoring Zachary's warning, tries to cross an unsafe snow bridge and falls to his death. When Zachary gets the woman to his village, he tells everyone that he went up the mountain to rob the plane and forced his brother to go with him, but his friends (Trevor, Demarest) know better.

Cast
 Spencer Tracy as Zachary Teller
 Robert Wagner as Christopher 'Chris' Teller
 Claire Trevor as Marie
 William Demarest as Father Belacchi
 Barbara Darrow as Simone
 Richard Arlen as C.W. Rivial
 E.G. Marshall as Solange
 Anna Kashfi as Hindu Girl
 Richard Garrick as Coloz
 Harry Townes as Joseph

See also
List of American films of 1956
Mountain film

References

External links

1950s adventure drama films
1956 drama films
1956 films
American adventure drama films
1950s English-language films
Films about brothers
Films based on French novels
Films directed by Edward Dmytryk
Films scored by Daniele Amfitheatrof
Films set in the Alps
Films with screenplays by Ranald MacDougall
Mountaineering films
1950s American films